Franz Höbling (1886 – 1965) was an Austrian actor and film director. He played the lead in the 1921 silent horror film The Grinning Face (1921). He co-starred several times with Magda Sonja.

Selected filmography

Actor
 The Jewess of Toledo (1919)
 Der Traum im Walde (1919)
 The Grinning Face (1921)
 Der hinkende Teufel (1922)
 Look After Your Daughters (1922)

References

Bibliography
 Barker, Clive. Clive Barker's A–Z of Horror. BBC Books, 1997.

External links
 

1886 births
1965 deaths
Austrian male stage actors
Austrian male film actors
Austrian male silent film actors
Austrian film directors
Male actors from Vienna
20th-century Austrian male actors
Burials at Ottakring Cemetery